Drano (styled as Drāno) is an American brand of chemical drain cleaner that is manufactured by S. C. Johnson & Son.

Crystal Drano 
According to the National Institutes of Health's Household Products Database, the crystal form is composed of:

 Sodium hydroxide (lye), NaOH
 Sodium nitrate, NaNO3
 Sodium chloride (salt), NaCl
 Aluminium shards, Al

After Drano crystals are added to water, the reaction works as follows:

 Aluminium reacts with lye: 2NaOH + 2Al + 2H2O → 3H2 + 2NaAlO2, although the exact species in solution may be NaAl(OH)4. The release of hydrogen gas stirs the mixture and improves the interaction between the lye and the materials clogging the drain. It's possible that pressure may build up inside the pipe, causing the hot, caustic solution to spurt out of the drain.
 Sodium nitrate reacts with hydrogen gas:  Na+ + NO3− + 4H2 → NaOH + NH3 + 2H2O. This removes hydrogen, which poses a fire and explosion hazard and produces ammonia, which is also capable of decomposing organic material, albeit less aggressively than lye. The sodium hydroxide (lye) is consumed by further action of the first reaction.

Crystal Drano was invented in 1923 by Harry Drackett.  From the 1960s into the 1980s, Drackett advertised Once in every week, Drano in every drain.

Bristol-Myers bought the Drackett Company in 1965 and sold it to S. C. Johnson in 1992.

Other Drano products

Drano Aerosol Plunger
Drano Aerosol Plunger was developed in the late 1960s, intended as a safer product that would be kinder environmentally. It was basically just a can of CFC propellant, the best-known brand of which was Freon. After Earth Day in 1970, there came increasing pressure to eliminate CFC propellants. Drackett used cheaper propellants, a blend of propane and butane, in all its other products. However, the propellant mix created a fire hazard.

The product was problematic. The forceful propellant required most consumers use both hands to control the can, plus another hand or two to hold a rag over the drain vent to contain the pressure.  The pressure sometimes knocked apart poor plumbing without blasting free the clog. Consumers who ignored instructions and attempted to use chemical drain openers first could be chemically burned from blow-back.

Liquid Drano
Liquid Drano was introduced in response to Clorox's purchase of Liquid-Plumr in 1969. Originally, it was simply a liquid lye (sodium hydroxide). In the late 1970s, the product was reformulated as a combination of liquid lye and sodium hypochlorite. Sodium hypochlorite is used in low (5%) concentration as laundry bleach and in higher concentrations as a swimming pool disinfectant.

Liquid Drano is marketed in several forms, including Drano Liquid Clog Remover, Drano Max Build-Up Remover, and Drano Dual-Force Foamer Clog Remover.  All are variations on the basic Liquid Drano formula.

Drano Foamer
Drano Foamer first started out a powder similar to Crystal Drano in which water had to be added. This was the first-ever foaming pipe snake product. This caused Liquid-Plumr to launch Liquid-Plumr: Foaming Pipe Snake, which is a 2-in-1 liquid.

Many years later, the makers of Drano decided to reimagine Drano Foamer as a 2 in 1 liquid known as the Dual Force Foamer.

Drano Kit
The Drano Snake Plus Drain Cleaning Kit combines a mechanical snake for loosening clogs, with yet another gel-variation on the Liquid Drano formula.

See also 
 Liquid-Plumr, another comparable drain cleaning brand by The Clorox Company.

References

External links 
 Official site
 NIH Household Product Database entry
 FTC order

Products introduced in 1923
Drano
Drano